On My Mother's Side is a Canadian psychological thriller film, directed by Dominic Goyer and released in 2016. The film stars Marc Paquet as David, an architect who discovers that his father Paul (Marc Béland) is not his real biological father, and undertakes an effort to uncover the truth of his origins.

The film's cast also includes Sylvie de Morais-Nogueira, Élise Guilbault, Germain Houde, David La Haye, Gilles Pelletier and Cynthia Wu-Maheux.

Wu-Maheux received a Prix Iris nomination for Best Supporting Actress at the 19th Quebec Cinema Awards in 2017.

References

External links
 

2016 films
2016 psychological thriller films
Canadian psychological thriller films
Quebec films
French-language Canadian films
2010s Canadian films